Xu Chongde (15 January 1929 – 3 March 2014) was a well-known legal expert and professor, political scientist, and member of the Communist Party of China.

Biography
Xu was born on 15 January 1929 in Qingpu, Shanghai. He studied law at the Fudan University and graduated in 1951. He continued his academic career by teaching at the Renmin University of China after finished his graduate study there. Between 1971 and 1978, Xu taught the history of the Communist Party of China at the Beijing Normal University. He later returned to the Renmin University and headed the constitutional teaching and research and the graduate study. He became professor and the mentor of the doctoral study in 1986. He retired in February 2000 and became the honorary professor at the Renmin University.

Xu also participated in the drafting of the Constitution of the People's Republic of China in 1954 and also the amendments of the Constitution. He was the member of the Constitution Amendments Committee from 1980 to 1982. Xu was appointed by the National People's Congress Standing Committee to the Hong Kong Basic Law Drafting Committee in 1985 and the Macau Basic Law Drafting Committee in 1988, responsible for the draftings of the Hong Kong Basic Law and Macau Basic Law. Xu was also appointed member of the Preparatory Committee for the Hong Kong SAR  in 1995 and the Preparatory Committee for the Macau SAR in 1998, witnessing the establishment of the two SARs.

In June 1998 he gave a lecture on legal study to the National People's Congress Standing Committee. In December 2002, he gave the first lecture on constitution to the Politburo of the Communist Party of China.

He died at 11:59 p.m. on 3 March 2014 in Beijing, aged 85.

References

1929 births
2014 deaths
Fudan University alumni
Academic staff of Renmin University of China
Chinese political scientists
Chinese legal scholars
People's Republic of China politicians from Shanghai
Chinese Communist Party politicians from Shanghai
Educators from Shanghai
Hong Kong Basic Law Drafting Committee members
Members of the Preparatory Committee for the Hong Kong Special Administrative Region